The Dylan Thomas Theatre is a theatre based in the Maritime Quarter, in the centre of the city of Swansea in Wales. The theatre officially opened under its present name in 1983, but was home to the Swansea Little Theatre from 1979.

Swansea Little Theatre
The Swansea Little Theatre is an amateur drama group based at The Dylan Thomas Theatre and was the first Little Theatre in Wales. The theatre group began performances from 1924 and was based at various different locations during its early years.

In the early 1930s poet Dylan Thomas became a member of the troupe after first reviewing plays by the Little Theatre for South Wales Evening Post. In 1932 he appeared with the group for a production of Noël Coward's Hay Fever, taking the role of Simon. A local critic wrote that Thomas' was "an artist with an explosive temper and untidy habits".  Thomas appeared in plays with the theatre for the next two or three years. The group maintained its link with Thomas' family when his daughter, Aeronwy Thomas-Ellis, became President of the Theatre.

In 1979 Swansea City Council offered the Swansea Little Theatre the derelict former Oscar Chess showroom and garage in an area which had been earmarked for development as a permanent home. On 29 September 1983 Sir Harry Secombe officially opened the Theatre now named the Dylan Thomas Theatre.

Notes

External links

 Dylan Thomas Theatre
 Swansea Little Theatre

Dylan Thomas
Theatres in Swansea